Mount Wintour is a  ridge-like mountain summit located  in the Opal Range of the Canadian Rockies of Alberta, Canada. It is situated in the Kananaskis River Valley east of Lower Kananaskis Lake and  Highway 40 in Peter Lougheed Provincial Park. The nearest higher neighbor is Mount Jerram,  to the east. The northern end of Mount Wintour forms the south canyon wall of King Creek which is a popular ice climbing destination. There are two climbing routes to the summit, the North Ridge and the South Ridge, both rated class 5.4.

History

The mountain was named in honor of Captain Charles John Wintour (1871–1916), Royal Navy commander of the 4th Destroyer Flotilla. He was killed when his flagship, the destroyer  was sunk by the German battleship  during the Battle of Jutland in World War I. The mountain's toponym was officially adopted in 1928 by the Geographical Names Board of Canada.

The first ascent of the peak was made in August 1968 by Glen Boles and E. Peyer via the North Ridge.

Geology

Mount Wintour is composed of sedimentary rock laid down during the Precambrian to Jurassic periods. Formed in shallow seas, this sedimentary rock was pushed east and over the top of younger rock during the Laramide orogeny.

Climate

Based on the Köppen climate classification, Mount Wintour is located in a subarctic climate with cold, snowy winters, and mild summers.

The months June through September offer the most favorable weather to climb Mount Wintour.

Precipitation runoff from the mountain drains into the Kananaskis River.

Gallery

See also
List of mountains of Canada
Geography of Alberta

References

External links
Charles John Wintour Charles Wintour biography
 Mount Wintour weather: Mountain Forecast

Wintour
Wintour
Wintour